Front for the Liberation of Djibouti (FLD) was a nationalist organization with the goal of liberation, and later guerrilla group located in the Afars and Issas (present-day Djibouti). FLD was founded in 1960 by Mahamoud Harbi. Its founding president was Adan Abdulle. FLD began armed activities inside Djibouti in 1968 and mainly drew its support from the Issa clan. The military struggle was actively supported by the government of Somalia in the 60s and 70s. In the struggle of independence, the Front for the Liberation of Djibouti sabotaged the Addis Ababa - Djibouti Railway in the 1977 near Dewele.
When France gave Djibouti its independence. The Front for the Liberation of Djibouti's forces joined the Djibouti Armed Forces

References

Rebel groups in Djibouti
Horn of Africa
History of Djibouti
French Somaliland
1960 establishments in French Somaliland